The Grotte de Cussac is a cave containing over 150 Paleolithic artworks as well as several human remains. It is located in the Dordogne river valley in Le Buisson-de-Cadouin, Dordogne, Aquitaine, France.

The cave was discovered on September 30, 2000, by amateur speleologist Marc Delluc and formally announced by the French Ministry of Culture on December 8, 2000. It is currently under protection for scientific study, and closed to the public.

The cave's artworks are estimated to be 25,000 years old, and are almost exclusively engravings, often very large, made with stone tools on the walls, or with fingers on clay soil. Pigments are limited to very few red dots. They include both classic instances of Upper Paleolithic animal art (bison, horses, mammoths, rhinoceroses, ibex) and rarer images including birds, enigmatic figures, and perhaps four female profiles. All appear close in theme and style of those known to Gravettien in the Quercy caves, in particular Pech Merle.

The cave's human remains appear to represent one of very few associations of parietal works and human burials in Paleolithic Europe. At least five people, four adults and a teenager, were deposited in the cavities, with bones dated by Carbon 14 measurements to approximately 25,000 years in age.

References 
 French Ministry of Culture: Grotte de Cussac 
 Norbert Aujoulat et al., "La grotte ornée de Cussac (Dordogne) — Observations liminaires", Paléo, N° 13 (2001).
 French Wikipedia entry.

Caves containing pictograms in France
Caves of Dordogne
Monuments historiques of Dordogne
Archaeological sites in France